Iphiana tenuisculpta is a species of sea snail, a marine gastropod mollusk in the family Pyramidellidae, the pyrams and their allies.

Description
The shell grows to a length of 13 mm. The pale wax-yellow shell has an elongate-conic shape. The sides of the spire are rectilinear in outline. The whorls of the protoconch are decollated. The teleoconch contains 11 flattened whorls (the apex and perhaps two or three of the whorls of the teleoconch are lost). These whorls are increasing very regularly in size. They are slightly shouldered at the summit and separated by well-marked sutures. They are marked by faint lines of growth and numerous fine, closely spaced spiral striations. The periphery of the body whorl is somewhat angulated. The base of the shell is very short, well rounded and slightly excavated at the umbilical region, and sculptured like the space between sutures. The aperture is subquadrate. The posterior angle is acute. The outer lip is thin, without internal lirations. The columella is short, somewhat twisted and revolute. It bears a moderately strong oblique fold a little anterior to its insertion.

Distribution
This species occurs in the Pacific Ocean off the Philippines and Japan.

References

 Okutani T., ed. (2000) Marine mollusks in Japan. Tokai University Press. 1173 pp. page(s): 707

External links
 To World Register of Marine Species
 

Pyramidellidae
Gastropods described in 1872